Portuguesa is a Portuguese, Catalan, and Spanish feminine adjective meaning "Portuguese". It may also refer to:

Places
Portuguesa (state), one of the 23 states of Venezuela
Portuguesa (Rio de Janeiro), a neighbourhood of Rio de Janeiro, Brazil
Portuguesa River, a river in Venezuela
Portuguese Circary, of the Premonstratensians
Portuguesa or Chiqllarasu, a mountain in Peru
Portuguesa Province, 1851-1864, one of the provinces of Venezuela

Other uses
Portuguese language
"A Portuguesa", the Portuguese national anthem
Associação Portuguesa de Desportos, a football club based in São Paulo, Brazil
Associação Atlética Portuguesa (RJ), a football club based in Rio de Janeiro, Brazil
Associação Atlética Portuguesa (Santos), a football club based in Santos, Brazil
Associação Portuguesa Londrinense, a football club based in Londrina, Brazil
Portuguesa Fútbol Club, a football club based in Acarígua, Venezuela